This is a list of schools in Flintshire in Wales.

Primary schools

Abbots Lane Infants School
Abermorddu Community Primary School
Brookfield Primary School
Broughton Primary School
Brynford Primary School
Cornist Park School
Bryn Deva Primary School
Derwen Primary School
Drury Primary School
Ewloe Green School
Golftyn Community Primary School
Gronant Community Primary School
Gwernymynydd Community Primary School
Gwynedd Primary School
Hawarden Infants School
Lixwm Primary School
Llanfynydd Community Primary School
Mountain Lane Primary School
Nannerch CW Primary School
Nercwys CW School
Northop Hall Primary School
Penarlag Primary School
Penyffordd Junior School
Perth y Terfyn Infants School
Queensferry Community Primary School
Rector Drew CW School
Rhesycae Controlled School
Rhos Helyg Primary School
St Anthony's RC Primary School
St David's RC Primary School
St Ethelwold's CW School
St John the Baptist's CW Primary School
St Mary's RC Primary School
St Winefride's RC Primary School
Saltney Ferry Primary School
Saltney Wood Memorial Primary School
Sandycroft Primary School
Sealand Primary School
Shotton Infants School
Southdown Primary School
Sychdyn Primary School
Taliesin Junior School
Trelawnyd Primary School
Venerable Edward Morgan RC Primary School
Wepre Primary School
Westwood Community Primary School
Ysgol Bro Carmel
Ysgol Bryn Coch
Ysgol Bryn Garth
Ysgol Bryn Gwalia
Ysgol Bryn Pennant
Ysgol Croes Atti
Ysgol Derwenfa
Ysgol Estyn Community Primary School
Ysgol Glan Aber
Ysgol Gwenffrwd
Ysgol Gymraeg Glanrafon
Ysgol Gynradd Trelogan
Ysgol Maes Edwin
Ysgol Maesglas
Ysgol Maes Y Felin
Ysgol Merllyn
Ysgol Mornant
Ysgol Mynydd Isa
Ysgol Owen Jones
Ysgol Parc y Llan
Ysgol Perth Y Terfyn
Ysgol Terrig
Ysgol y Foel
Ysgol y Fron
Ysgol Y Llan CW
Ysgol y Waun
Ysgol yr Esgob CW

Secondary schools
Alun School
Argoed High School*
Castell Alun High School
Connah's Quay High School
Elfed High School 
Flint High School
Hawarden High School
St David's High School*
St Richard Gwyn RC High School
Ysgol Maes Garmon
Ysgol Treffynnon

(*) Incomplete Secondary School which does not have a Sixth Form

Special schools
Bryn Tirion Hall 
Ysgol Maes Hyfryd
Ysgol Pen Coch

 
Flintshire